Donde comienza la tristeza, is a Mexican telenovela that aired on  Canal 4, Telesistema Mexicano in 1960.

Cast 
  Rita Macedo
 Carlos Cores
  Jesús Valero

Production 
Original Story: Raúl Astor
Adaptation: Raúl Astor
Managing Director: Rafael Banquells

References 

1960 telenovelas
Mexican telenovelas
Televisa telenovelas
Television shows set in Mexico City
1960 Mexican television series debuts
1960 Mexican television series endings
Spanish-language telenovelas